Provincial Integration Party Three (in Spanish: Partido Integración Provincial Tres) is a political party in Cartago, Costa Rica. The party was founded in 2003, and recognized in 2003. Party president is Isabel Cristina Arias Calderón, and the party secretary José Abel Bonilla Castillo.

External links
Party statues for download

Political parties in Costa Rica